Radikal was a daily liberal Turkish language newspaper, published in Istanbul. From 1996 it was published by Aydın Doğan's Doğan Media Group. Although Radikal did not endorse a particular political alignment, it was generally considered by the public as a social liberal newspaper. Despite only having a circulation of around 25,000 (July 2013), it was considered one of the most influential Turkish newspapers.

It was praised for its culture, arts, and interview sections, as well as columnists such as M. Serdar Kuzuloğlu, Hakkı Devrim, Yıldırım Türker, Türker Alkan, Tarhan Erdem, Cengiz Çandar, and Altan Öymen. Hasan Celal Güzel, former minister of national education, Murat Yetkin, and Mustafa Akyol, son of Taha Akyol, also write for Radikal.

On 22 March 2016, it was announced that the newspaper was shutting down by the end of the month due to financial reasons.

History
Radikal was founded in 1996, and "within a decade ... had become one of the most influential newspapers in the country, especially renowned for its top-drawer columnists and its coverage of intellectual debates". Its circulation, however, remained relatively low.

In 2004 Radikal was awarded the Turk Democracy Associations "Democracy Media Award" (jointly with Zaman).

In 2007, Serkan Özkaya, Orhan Pamuk and Sezen Aksu each became 'Radikal's temporary editors-in-chief for a day.

The Dogan Group's economics daily Referans was merged into Radikal in 2010, with Referans editor-in-chief Eyüp Can becoming editor-in-chief of the combined paper, replacing İsmet Berkan. Later in 2010 the paper moved to a tabloid format and introduced new columnists Dilek Kurban of TESEV, Cüneyt Özdemir, and Sırrı Süreyya Önder.

The newspaper stopped printing on 21 June 2014 and was published only digitally, before it was shut abruptly shut down in March 2016. On 4 April 2016, its columnists published their farewell articles on its webpage, reflecting on Radikal's past 20 years. In July 2022, the domain of the newspaper was deserted, resulting the online archive to wipe out. Demirören Holding, the rights owner, did not make any disclosure about the shut down.

Sections
The paper had following sections:
Türkiye - usually with domestic news
Yaşam - usually with health and entertainment articles from Turkey and the world
Politika - with political news, focusing on domestic
Dış Haberler - with foreign news
Yorum - opinion pieces, editorials
Ekonomi - economic news
Spor - sports news
Kültür/Sanat - with cultural and art news
"Sıcak Haber", online edition with the printed articles

The paper also publishes four supplements:
"Kitap", weekly book reviews, out on Fridays
"Cumartesi", weekend entertainment and news, out on Saturdays
"Radikal 2", op-eds, mostly on social-democracy or current political issues, out on Sundays
"Genç", op-eds submitted by college students, out every other Tuesday.

Notable contributors
 İsmail Saymaz (investigative journalist)
 Ezgi Başaran (investigative reporter and website managing editor, awarded the Müşerref Hekimoğlu Award 2012)
 Ertuğrul Mavioğlu (news co-ordinator)
 Altan Öymen (columnist)
 Orhan Kemal Cengiz 
 Cengiz Çandar (columnist)
 Cüneyt Özdemir (columnist)
 Ümit Kivanç (columnist)
 Yiğit Bulut (columnist, 2001–2007)
 Perihan Mağden (columnist, 2001–2008)
 Oral Çalışlar (columnist, 2008–2013)
 Sırrı Süreyya Önder (columnist, 2010–2011)

References

External links
  

1996 establishments in Turkey
2016 disestablishments in Turkey
Newspapers published in Istanbul
Turkish-language newspapers
Publications established in 1996
Publications disestablished in 2016
Doğan Media Group
Defunct newspapers published in Turkey
Online newspapers with defunct print editions
Daily newspapers published in Turkey